Sylvain Côté (born January 19, 1966) is a Canadian former professional ice hockey player who spent 19 seasons in the NHL, the majority of them with the Washington Capitals. He also played for the Hartford Whalers, Toronto Maple Leafs, Chicago Blackhawks and Dallas Stars.

Biography
Côté was born in Quebec City, Quebec, but grew up in Duberger, Quebec. As a youth, he played in the 1978 and 1979 Quebec International Pee-Wee Hockey Tournaments with a minor ice hockey team from Quebec City, and played with his brother in the 1979 event. 

Côté was all-Star selection as a defenceman in the  1986 IIHF World Junior Hockey Championships He was originally selected by Hartford Whalers in the first round (#11 overall) of the 1984 NHL Entry Draft. He was a member of the 2000 Dallas team that went to the Stanley Cup Finals.

Career statistics

Regular season and playoffs

International

See also
List of NHL players with 1000 games played

References

External links

1966 births
Living people
Binghamton Whalers players
Canadian ice hockey defencemen
Chicago Blackhawks players
Dallas Stars players
French Quebecers
Hartford Whalers draft picks
Hartford Whalers players
Hull Olympiques players
National Hockey League first-round draft picks
Quebec Remparts players
Toronto Maple Leafs players
Washington Capitals players
Ice hockey people from Quebec City